Yalama is a village and municipality in the Khachmaz Rayon of Azerbaijan, located adjacent to the Azerbaijan–Russia border. It has a population of 4,762.  The municipality consists of the villages of Yalama, Düztahiroba, Səlimoba, Ortaoba, Ukuroba, Yaquboba, Zeyxuroba, and Zuxuloba.

References 

Populated places in Khachmaz District